KD-414 is a COVID-19 vaccine candidate developed by Japanese biotechnology company KM Biologics Co. Results of a phase 1/2 clinical trial for this vaccine were released as a preprint in June 2022.

References 

Clinical trials
Japanese COVID-19 vaccines
Inactivated vaccines